Coxequesoma is a genus of tortoise mites in the family Uropodidae. There are about five described species in Coxequesoma.

Species
These five species belong to the genus Coxequesoma:
 Coxequesoma collegianorum Sellnick, 1926
 Coxequesoma gignodissidens Elzinga
 Coxequesoma hermanni Elzinga
 Coxequesoma labidocoxata Elzinga
 Coxequesoma umbocauda Elzinga

References

Uropodidae
Articles created by Qbugbot